The Bakoena or Bakwena ("those who venerate the crocodile") are a large clan in Southern Africa. They form part of the Sotho-Tswana Bantu people and can be found in different countries such as Lesotho, Botswana, South Africa, Zimbabwe and Eswatini. Their main languages are Sesotho and Setswana."Koena" ("Kwena") is a Sotho/Tswana word meaning "crocodile", the crocodile is also their totem (seboko).

Genealogy and history
Earliest ancestor o the  Koena tribe,koena, was a grandson of Masilo I, the king of Bahurutse branch of the koena around AD 1360. Koena and his followers settled at Tebang, now called Heidelberg. Around AD 1500, Bakoena started spreading in the region, from the Lekwa or Vaal river to Kalahari (Botswana).

Sotho line
 Bokoena state under kgosikgolo (meaning paramount chief) Napo
 Kgoshi (sotho word meaning chief) Motebang 
 Kgoshi Molemo 
 Kgoshi Tsholoane 
 Kgoshi Monaheng 
 Kgoshi Motloang 
 Kgoshi Peete 
 Kgoshi Mokhachane 
 Kgoshi Moshoeshoe
and it continues to the royal line of Lesotho.

Botswana line
Kgabo II led a small group of Bakoena and crossed the Marico river and founded a tribe on the lands of the Bakgatla tribe (whose totem was the blue monkey) which they drove away, modern day Botswana. As the result of a split, several tribes like the ngwato and ngwaketse were formed and settled in a circular way, with the paramount Kwena settling at Ntsoana-Tsatsi (mythical origin land of the sotho people) with the Bafokeng around AD 1580.

References

Sotho-Tswana peoples in South Africa